Colfosceril palmitate (trade name Exosurf) is a drug used as a pulmonary surfactant. It is a drug that is used in surfactant deficient conditions such as infant respiratory distress syndrome in newborns.

See also 
Dipalmitoylphosphatidylcholine

References 

Palmitate esters
Phosphate esters